Mayenne is a department of France in Pays de la Loire.

Mayenne may also refer to:

 Mayenne (commune), a town in the department
 Mayenne (river), France
 Charles, Duke of Mayenne, leader of the Catholic League against Henry IV of France